Atopochilus vogti is a species of upside-down catfish endemic to Tanzania where it occurs in the Wami River.  This species grows to a length of  TL.

Etymology
The catfish is named in honor of monsignor Franz Xaver Vogt (1870-1943), who was a German Catholic Missionary in Bagamoyo, German East Africa , which is now Tanzania, who sent the type specimen to the Muséum national d’Histoire naturelle in Paris.

References

Atopochilus
Fish of Tanzania
Taxa named by Jacques Pellegrin
Fish described in 1922
Taxonomy articles created by Polbot